Katherine Anne Porter (May 15, 1890 – September 18, 1980) was an American journalist, essayist, short story writer, novelist, poet and political activist. Her 1962 novel Ship of Fools was the best-selling novel in America that year, but her short stories received much more critical acclaim.

Biography

Early life
Katherine Anne Porter was born in Indian Creek, Texas as Callie Russell Porter to Harrison Boone Porter and Mary Alice (Jones) Porter. Although her father claimed maternal descent from American frontiersman Daniel Boone, Porter herself altered this alleged descent to be from Boone's brother Jonathan as "the record of his descendants was obscure, so that no-one could contradict her.” This relationship was unfounded. Porter was enthusiastic about her own genealogy and family history, and spent years constructing a "quasi-official" version of her ancestry alleging descent from a companion of William the Conqueror, although "most of the genealogical connections she boasted did not exist." The writer O. Henry (William Sydney Porter) was claimed as her father's second cousin, but later research established that "except the accident of her name", there was no connection. Despite her focus on her family history, Porter failed to identify her relationship to Lyndon B. Johnson, 36th President of the United States, his grandmother being the sister of Porter's uncle-by-marriage. The rest of Porter's family did not take her genealogical embellishments seriously, considering them to be part of her character as an "accomplished raconteur".

In 1892, when Porter was two years old, her mother died two months after giving birth. Porter's father took his four surviving children (an older brother had died in infancy) to live with his mother, Catherine Ann Porter, in Kyle, Texas. The depth of her grandmother's influence can be inferred from Porter's later adoption of her name. Her grandmother died while taking eleven-year-old Callie to visit relatives in Marfa, Texas.

After her grandmother's death, the family lived in several towns in Texas and Louisiana, staying with relatives or living in rented rooms. She was enrolled in free schools wherever the family was living, and for a year in 1904 she attended the Thomas School, a private Methodist school in San Antonio, Texas. This was her only formal education beyond grammar school.

Young adulthood and illness
In 1906, at age sixteen, Porter left home and married John Henry Koontz in Lufkin, Texas. She subsequently converted to his religion, Roman Catholicism. Koontz, the son of a wealthy Texas ranching family, was physically abusive; once while drunk, he threw her down the stairs, breaking her ankle. They divorced officially in 1915.

In 1914 she escaped to Chicago, where she worked briefly as an extra in movies. She then returned to Texas and worked the small-town entertainment circuit as an actress and singer. In 1915, she asked that her name be changed to Katherine Anne Porter as part of her divorce decree.

Also in 1915, she was diagnosed with tuberculosis and spent the following two years in sanatoria, where she decided to become a writer. It was discovered during that time, however, that she had bronchitis, not TB. In 1917, she began writing for the Fort Worth Critic, critiquing dramas and writing society gossip. In 1918, she wrote for the Rocky Mountain News in Denver, Colorado. In the same year, Katherine almost died in Denver during the 1918 flu pandemic. When she was discharged from the hospital months later, she was frail and completely bald. When her hair finally grew back, it was white and remained that color for the rest of her life. Her experience was reflected in her trilogy of short novels, Pale Horse, Pale Rider (1939), for which she received the first annual gold medal for literature in 1940 from the Society of Libraries of New York University.

New York and Mexico: First literary works
In 1919, Porter moved to Greenwich Village in New York City and made her living ghost writing, writing children's stories and doing publicity work for a motion picture company. The year in New York City had a politically radicalizing effect on her; and in 1920, she went to work for a magazine publisher in Mexico, where she became acquainted with members of the Mexican leftist movement, including Diego Rivera. Eventually, however, Porter became disillusioned with the revolutionary movement and its leaders. In the 1920s she also became intensely critical of religion, and remained so until the last decade of her life, when she again embraced the Roman Catholic Church.

Between 1920 and 1930, Porter traveled back and forth between Mexico and New York City and began publishing short stories and essays. Her first published story was "Maria Concepcion" in The Century Magazine. (In his 1960s novel Providence Island, Calder Willingham had the character Jim fantasize a perfect lover and he called her Maria Concepcion Diaz.) In 1930, she published her first short-story collection, Flowering Judas and Other Stories. An expanded edition of this collection was published in 1935 and received such critical acclaim that it alone virtually assured her place in American literature.

In 1926, Porter married Ernest Stock and lived briefly in Connecticut before divorcing him in 1927. Some biographers suggest that Porter suffered several miscarriages, at least one stillbirth between 1910 and 1926, and an abortion; and after contracting gonorrhea from Stock, that she had a hysterectomy in 1927, ending her hopes of ever having a child. Yet Porter's letters to her lovers suggest that she still intimated her menstruation after this alleged hysterectomy. She once confided to a friend that "I have lost children in all the ways one can."

Acclaimed writing career and teaching
During the 1930s, 1940s and 1950s, Porter enjoyed a prominent reputation as one of America's most distinguished writers, but her limited output and equally-limited sales had her living on grants and advances for most of the era.

During the 1930s, she spent several years in Europe during which she continued to publish short stories. She married Eugene Pressly, a writer, in 1930. In 1938, upon returning from Europe, she divorced Pressly and married Albert Russel Erskine, Jr., a graduate student. He reportedly divorced her in 1942, after discovering her real age and that she was 20 years his senior. 

Porter became an elected member of the National Institute of Arts and Letters in 1943, and was a writer-in-residence at several colleges and universities, including the University of Chicago, the University of Michigan, and the University of Virginia.

Between 1948 and 1958, she taught at Stanford University, the University of Michigan, Washington and Lee University, and the University of Texas, where her unconventional manner of teaching made her popular with students. In 1959 the Ford Foundation granted Porter $26,000 over two years.

Three of Porter's stories were adapted into radio dramas on the program NBC University Theatre. "Noon Wine" was made into an hour drama in early 1948, and two years later "Flowering Judas" and "Pale Horse, Pale Rider" each were produced in half-hour dramas on an episode of the hour-long program. Porter herself made two appearances on the radio series giving critical commentary on works by Rebecca West and Virginia Woolf. In the 1950s and 1960s she occasionally appeared on television in programs discussing literature.

Porter published her only novel, Ship of Fools, in 1962; it was based on her reminiscences of a 1931 ocean cruise she had taken from Vera Cruz, Mexico, to Germany. The novel's success finally gave her financial security (she reportedly sold the film rights for Ship of Fools for $500,000). Producer David O. Selznick was after the film rights; but United Artists who owned the property, demanded $400,000. The novel was adapted for film by Abby Mann; producer and director Stanley Kramer featured Vivien Leigh in her final film performance.

Despite Porter's claim that after the publication of Ship of Fools she would not win any more prizes in America, in 1966 she was awarded the Pulitzer Prize and the U.S. National Book Award for The Collected Stories of Katherine Anne Porter. That year she was also appointed to the American Academy of Arts and Letters. She was nominated for the Nobel Prize in Literature five times between 1964 and 1968.

In 1977, she published The Never-Ending Wrong, an account of the notorious trial and execution of Sacco and Vanzetti, which she had protested 50 years earlier.

Death
Porter died in Silver Spring, Maryland, on September 18, 1980, at the age of 90, and her ashes were buried next to her mother at Indian Creek Cemetery in Texas. In 1990, Recorded Texas Historic Landmark number 2905 was placed in Brown County, Texas, to honor the life and career of Porter.

Awards and honors
1966 – Pulitzer Prize for Fiction for The Collected Stories (1965)
1966 – National Book Award for The Collected Stories (1965)
1967 – Gold Medal Award for Fiction from the American Academy of Arts and Letters
Five nominations for the Nobel Prize in Literature (1964, 1965, 1966, 1967, 1968)
2006 – Porter was featured on a States postage stamp issued May 15, 2006 with a value of 39¢. She was the 22nd person featured in the Literary Arts commemorative stamp series.

Works

Short story collections
Flowering Judas (Harcourt, Brace: 1930). Includes eight of Porter's earliest short stories.
Flowering Judas and Other Stories (Harcourt, Brace: 1935). Includes the contents of the earlier edition as well as four additional stories.
Pale Horse, Pale Rider: Three Short Novels (Harcourt, Brace: 1939). Includes the three stories Porter referred to as short novels: "Old Mortality", "Noon Wine" (American radio, 1948; American TV, 1966; American TV, 1985), and "Pale Horse, Pale Rider" (American radio, 1950; Canadian TV, 1963 & British TV, 1964).
The Leaning Tower and Other Stories (Harcourt, Brace: 1944). Includes nine of Porter's short stories. 
The Old Order: Stories of the South (Harcourt, Brace: 1955). Includes ten of Porter's previously published short stories, all of which take place in the American South.
The Collected Stories of Katherine Anne Porter (Harcourt, Brace: 1964). Includes all twenty-six of Porter's previously published short stories, including the three she preferred to call short novels.

Novel
Ship of Fools, (Little, Brown, & Co.: 1962; (American film, 1965).

Nonfiction
The Days Before (Harcourt, Brace: 1952). Includes many of Porter's book reviews, critical essays, memoirs, etc.
The Collected Essays and Occasional Writings of Katherine Anne Porter (Delacorte: 1970).

Posthumous publications
Letters of Katherine Anne Porter (Atlantic Monthly Press: 1990), edited by Isabel Bayley. Includes portions of over 250 letters Porter wrote to over sixty correspondents between 1930 and 1966.
"This Strange, Old World" and Other Book Reviews Written by Katherine Anne Porter (University of Georgia Press, 1991), edited by Darlene Harbour Unrue. Includes almost 50 of the book reviews Porter published in various periodicals during her lifetime.
Uncollected Early Prose of Katherine Anne Porter (University of Texas Press: 1993), edited by Ruth M. Alvarez and Thomas F. Walsh. Includes twenty-nine of Porter's prose works of fiction and nonfiction, not included in earlier published editions.
Katherine Anne Porter's Poetry (University of South Carolina Press: 1996), edited by Darlene Harbour Unrue. Includes all thirty-two of the poems Porter published in periodicals during her lifetime.
Porter: Collected Stories and Other Writings (Library of America: 2008). Includes the full text of "The Collected Stories of Katherine Anne Porter" (Harcourt, Brace 1964) as well as many of the pieces that were included in her two previous collections of nonfiction.
Selected Letters of Katherine Anne Porter: Chronicles of a Modern Woman (University Press of Mississippi: 2012), edited by Darlene Harbour Unrue. Includes over 130 complete letters Porter wrote to over seventy correspondents between 1916 and 1979.

Other publications
My Chinese Marriage by Mae Franking, ghostwritten by Porter (Duffield & Co: 1921).
Outline of Mexican Popular Arts and Crafts (Young & McCallister: 1922).
Katherine Anne Porter's French Song Book (Harrison of Paris: 1933). Includes seventeen French songs and Porter's English translations.
A Christmas Story (Delacorte: 1967). Porter's story, previously published, about her niece Mary Alice Hillendahl.
The Never-Ending Wrong (Little, Brown, & Co.: 1977). Porter's reflections upon the 1927 executions of Nicola Sacco and Bartolomeo Vanzetti.

Notes

References

Bibliography

 Givner, Joan. Katherine Anne Porter: A Life. Athens, GA: University of Georgia Press, 1991, First edition 1982. .
 Hardwick, Elisabeth. "What she was and what she felt like." The New York Times, November 7, 1982. Retrieved: November 18, 2011.
 Nance, William L. Katherine Anne Porter and the Art of Rejection. Chapel Hill, NC: University of North Carolina Press, 1963. 
 Tanner, James Thomas Fontenot, PhD. The Texas Legacy of Katherine Anne Porter Texas Writers Series (Book 3). Denton, TX: University of North Texas Press, 1991.  .
 Unrue, Darlene Harbour. Katherine Anne Porter Remembered. Tuscaloosa, AL: University of Alabama Press, 2010. .

External links
 
 
 
 
 
 
 
 Brief biography at Perspectives in American Literature
 Katherine Anne Porter at American Masters (PBS)
 Photos of the first edition of Porter's Pulitzer Prize winning book
 Official site of Porter's childhood home in Kyle, TX
 Papers of Katherine Anne Porter and Paul Porter papers housed at Hornbake Library, University of Maryland Libraries
 Stuart Wright Collection: Katherine Anne Porter Papers (#1169-009), East Carolina Manuscript Collection, J. Y. Joyner Library, East Carolina University
 Mary Louis Doherty papers, at the University of Maryland libraries. Contains correspondence with Katherine Anne Porter.
 Harry C. Perry, Jr. papers, at the University of Maryland libraries. Contains correspondence with and financial papers of Katherine Anne Porter.
 Cyrilly Abels papers, at the University of Maryland libraries. Abels was the literary agent, editor, and friend of Katherine Anne Porter.
 Glenway Wescott and Monroe Wheeler Collection of Katherine Anne Porter. Yale Collection of American Literature, Beinecke Rare Book and Manuscript Library.

1890 births
1980 deaths
20th-century American novelists
American expatriates in Mexico
American women novelists
American women short story writers
Modernist writers
Modernist women writers
National Book Award winners
O. Henry Award winners
Pulitzer Prize for Fiction winners
Writers from New York City
People from Fort Worth, Texas
Writers from San Antonio
Recorded Texas Historic Landmarks
Novelists from Louisiana
Novelists from Texas
American women essayists
American women journalists
20th-century American women writers
University of Michigan people
People from Brown County, Texas
20th-century American short story writers
20th-century American essayists
Journalists from Texas
Novelists from New York (state)
People from Kyle, Texas
Catholics from Texas
Christian novelists
20th-century American journalists
Members of the American Academy of Arts and Letters